Enzo Artoni (born 27 January 1976), is a professional tennis player who represented Italy.

During his career Artoni won 2 doubles titles. He enjoyed most of his pro tour tennis success while playing doubles. He achieved a career-high doubles ranking of world No. 69 in 2005.

ATP Career Finals

Doubles: 3 (2 titles, 1 runner-up)

ATP Challenger and ITF Futures finals

Singles: 2 (0–2)

Doubles: 36 (25–11)

External links
 
 

Citizens of Italy through descent
Italian male tennis players
Italian sportspeople of Argentine descent
Tennis players from Buenos Aires
1976 births
Living people